The World Dodgeball Association, also known as WDA, is the world governing body for the sport of dodgeball. World Dodgeball Association (WDA) was granted observer status by the Global Association of International Sports Federations in 17 April 2020.

Responsibility 
The WDA regulates dodgeball events and competitions globally and also sets the rules guiding the sport.

See also
World Dodgeball Federation

References

External links

International sports organizations
Dodgeball